Bloomfield Township is one of the twenty-four townships of Trumbull County, Ohio, United States.  The 2000 census found 1,097 people in the township.

Geography
Located in the northwestern part of the county, it borders the following townships:
Orwell Township, Ashtabula County – north
Colebrook Township, Ashtabula County – northeast corner
Greene Township – east
Mecca Township – southeast corner
Bristol Township – south
Farmington Township – southwest corner
Mesopotamia Township – west
Windsor Township, Ashtabula County – northwest corner

No municipalities are located in Bloomfield Township, although the unincorporated community of North Bloomfield lies at the center of the township.

Name and history
Statewide, other Bloomfield Townships are located in Jackson and Logan counties.

Government
The township is governed by a three-member board of trustees, who are elected in November of odd-numbered years to a four-year term beginning on the following January 1. Two are elected in the year after the presidential election and one is elected in the year before it. There is also an elected township fiscal officer, who serves a four-year term beginning on April 1 of the year after the election, which is held in November of the year before the presidential election. Vacancies in the fiscal officership or on the board of trustees are filled by the remaining trustees.

References

External links
County website

Townships in Trumbull County, Ohio
Townships in Ohio